SCM Gloria Buzău is a women's handball club from Buzău, Romania, that competes in the Liga Națională and the European League (formerly known as EHF Cup).

Kits

Players

Current squad

Squad for the 2022–23 season

Goalkeepers
 16  Ljubica Nenezić
 32  Raluca Kelemen 
 43  Marta Batinović
Wingers
LW
 25  Oana Andreea Sîrb
 28  Alina Czeczi
 77  Ana Maria Iuganu 
RW
 29  Maria Luana Drăgănoiu
 79  Andra Moroianu 
Line players
 4  Yaroslava Burlachenko
 6  Alexandra Subțirică
 83  Marija Petrović

Back players
LB
 13  Ioana Amalia Stancu
 21  Dziyana Ilyina
 31  Bianca Tiron
 88  Kristina Prkačin 
CB
7  Valentina Blažević
 17  Carmen Stoleru (c)
 30  Mădălina Zamfirescu 

RB
 14  Fanta Keïta
 33  Natallia Vasileuskaya
 96  Alina Ilie

Transfers
Transfers for the 2023–24 season

 Joining
  Ovidiu Mihăilă (Head Coach) (from  CSA Steaua București) ?
  Ana Măzăreanu (GK) (from  CS Măgura Cisnădie)
  Tea Pijević (GK) (from  Alba Fehérvár KC)
  Raluca Nicolae (LW) (from  CS Dacia Mioveni 2012)
  Tamara Pál (CB) (from  MTK Budapest)
  Daria Bucur (RB) (from  SCM Râmnicu Vâlcea)
  Bibiana Štefaniková (RW) (from  IUVENTA Michalovce)
  Hawa N'Diaye (LP) (from  Siófok KC) 
  Aleksandra Zimny (LB) (from  JKS Jarosław)

 Leaving
  Raluca Kelemen (GK) (to  SCM Râmnicu Vâlcea)
  Marta Batinović (GK) (to  CS Măgura Cisnădie)  
  Alina Czeczi (LW) (unknown destination)
  Carmen Stoleru (CB) (unknown destination or retires)
  Natallia Vasileuskaya (RB) (to  CS Măgura Cisnădie)
  Alina Ilie (RB) (unknown destination)
  Alexandra Subțirică (LP) (unknown destination or retires)

References

External links

 

Romanian handball clubs
Sport in Buzău
Liga Națională (women's handball) clubs
Handball clubs established in 1990
1990 establishments in Romania